The oldest institution of higher education in Nicaragua is the National Autonomous University of Nicaragua, which was founded in León in 1812, during the Spanish colonial period. In Nicaragua, there are ten core public and private non-profit universities that receive state funding, and these constitute the members of the National Council of Universities. This body is responsible for strategic planning for higher education in Nicaragua, and it is also the organization that provide accreditation to other universities.

The members of the National Council of Universities are the oldest universities in Nicaragua, with the last one founded in 1992. Since the early 1990s, a large number of new private universities have been established in Nicaragua, responding to a greatly increased educational demand fueled by the increasing student enrollment in elementary and secondary schools during the 1980s. Most private universities that are not part of the National Council of Universities are members of either the Federation of Nicaraguan Private Universities (FENUP) or the Superior Council of Private Universities (COSUP). The major focus of these private universities are on business, computers and law, but together they span most areas of academic study.

The majority of higher education institutions are in Managua. Higher education has financial, organic and administrative autonomy, according to the law. Also, freedom of subjects is recognized. Nicaragua's higher education system consists of 58 universities, and 113 colleges and technical institutes in the areas of electronics, computer systems and sciences, agroforestry, construction and trade-related services. In 2005, almost 400,000 (7%) of Nicaraguans held a university degree.

Academic degrees

Admission to higher education is on the basis of the Bachillerato, the leading secondary school qualification. Students are also subject to an entrance examination. The Licenciado (or Ingenierio in the case of engineering programs), is the main undergraduate degree and a four or five-year course of study. A professional title may also be awarded depending on the subject. Following the Licenciado, the first postgraduate degree is the Maestria, which lasts two years and culminates with the submission of a thesis.

Institutions of higher learning also offer two or three year courses in technical and vocational education. The main qualification studied for is the Técnico Superior.

List of universities
This is a list of the 58 universities accredited by the National Council of Universities in Nicaragua.

Notes:

Names in bold indicates that the university is a member of the National Council of Universities (CNU).
Main campus first on universities with multiple locations.

See also

Education in Nicaragua
List of schools in Nicaragua
Nicaraguan Literacy Campaign

References

 
Universities
Nicaragua, list of schools in
Nicaragua
Sitio Oficial UNIAG